Shaun Casey (born January 7, 1954) is a former model active from the mid-1970s through the mid-1980s. By 1987 she had given up modeling for all but a few favorite clients.

In the late 1970s, Casey was associated with hairstylist, John Sahag, who created a stir by cutting her hair extremely short and bleaching it white for a Helmut Newton cover of Vogue Paris.

Shaun Casey was the Estée Lauder girl from 1979 to 1984. She was one of Calvin Klein's first models. Klein custom designed her wedding dress to her first husband. Her first advertisement in 1979 called "Grand Cafe Colors." Others were 1981's "The Great American Desert," 1982's "Perfectly Natural Liquid Makeup," 1982's "Country Manor Colors," 1983's "Greek Island Colors," and 1983's Polished Performance Liquid Makeup."  Shaun Casey graced six Harper's Bazaar covers, eight Glamour covers, one French Vogue cover, a few Italian Bazaar covers, one British Vogue cover, and is known as one of the first super models.

Casey also had a cameo in the 1977 Woody Allen romantic comedy Annie Hall.

Casey described modeling as "a grind, it's just like any other job" and said of her pictures, "Gosh, I wish I looked like that every day."

Shaun Casey was married to actor Roger Wilson from 1978 to 1983.

References

External links

American female models
Living people
1954 births
Place of birth missing (living people)
21st-century American women